Isili, Ìsili in sardinian language, is a comune (municipality) in the province of South Sardinia, southern Sardinia, Italy, located about  north of Cagliari in the Sarcidano traditional region.

Isili borders the following municipalities: Gergei, Gesturi, Laconi, Nuragus, Nurallao, Nurri, Serri, Villanova Tulo.

Main sights
Nuraghe Is Paras

References 

Cities and towns in Sardinia